Ginette Baudin (1921–1971) was a French stage and film actress. She was married to the actor Andrex.

Selected filmography
 The Stairs Without End (1943)
 Son of France (1946)
 The Beautiful Trip (1947)
 The Unexpected Voyager (1950)
 The Damned Lovers (1952)

References

Bibliography
 Goble, Alan. The Complete Index to Literary Sources in Film. Walter de Gruyter, 1999.

External links

1921 births
1971 deaths
People from Montceau-les-Mines
French film actresses
20th-century French women